The Worcestershire Historical Society is an historical society and text publication society for the county of Worcestershire in England. It was founded in 1893.

Selected publications
 Court Rolls of Romsley, 1279-1643, Matthew Tompkins, New series 27, 2017.
 The Autobiography and Library of Thomas Hall, B.D. (1610-1665), Denise Thomas, New series 26, 2015
 The Diary and Papers of Henry Townshend, 1640-1663, Stephen Porter, Stephen K. Roberts and Ian Roy, New series 25, 2014.
 Register of Simon de Montacute, Bishop of Worcester, 1334-1337, Editor: Roy Haines, New series 15, 1996.
 Worcestershire Taxes in the 1520s. The Military Survey and Forced Loans of 1522-3 and the Lay Subsidy of 1524-7, Editor: Michael Faraday, New series 19, 2003.
 Court Rolls of Elmley Castle, Worcestershire, 1347-1564, Editor: Robert K. Field, New series 20, 2004.
 Records of Feckenham Forest, Worcestershire, c. 1236-1377, Editor: Jean Birrell, New series 21, 2006.
 The Worcestershire Eyre of 1275, Jens Röhrkasten, New series, 22, 2008.
 Tithe Apportionments of Worcestershire, 1837-1851, Peter L. Walker, New series 23, 2011.
 Noble Household Management and Spiritual Discipline in Fifteenth-Century Worcestershire, James P. Toomey, Robert N. Swanson and David Guya, New series 24, 2013.

References 

1893 establishments in England
History of Worcestershire
Historical societies of the United Kingdom
Text publication societies